Glen Haven may refer to:
 Glen Haven, Alberta
 Glen Haven, Nova Scotia
 Glen Haven, Colorado
 Glen Haven, Michigan
 Glen Haven, New York
 Glen Haven, Wisconsin, a town
 Glen Haven (CDP), Wisconsin, an unincorporated community